Alton is a community located in Caledon, Ontario. It is also part of the Peel Region. It has a population of 1,116.  It was established in 1820.

Geography 
Alton is located near the Caledon Creek and the Alton Pond, where the Millcroft Inn is located upon. It is also located on the banks of Shaw's Creek. An old 1-track rail line lies at the east end of the community.  New houses are currently being built west of Main Street.  The Niagara Escarpement runs north of the community.

Places of Interest 

 Alton Mills Arts Centre 
 Millcroft Inn and Spa 
 Spirit Tree Cidery 
 Osprey Valley 
 Paul Morin Gallery

References 

Neighbourhoods in Caledon, Ontario